John Marshall Roberts is an American public speaker and communication strategist. He is the author of the book Igniting Inspiration: A Persuasion Manual for Visionaries. His articles on social psychology, empathy, sustainability and marketing have appeared in Sustainable Life Media, TriplePundit, Greenbiz.com, and CTN Green.

Career
He has been profiled in: Business Day (New Zealand), Fast Company, TreeHugger, HuffingtonPost, EcoSalon, Care2, and Reality Sandwich.

In 2009, Roberts founded the communication research firm, Worldview Thinking. He has been hired as a communications consultant by clients including the New Zealand Department of Conservation, Royal Plunket Society, EcoAlign, and Sustainable Life Media.

In 2010 Roberts launched the Roberts Worldview Assessment at Sustainable Brands ’10.

Works
Igniting Inspiration: A Persuasion Manual for Visionaries 
The Voice Code: Master Your Inner Game

References

External links
John Marshall Roberts site

Living people
American telecommunications industry businesspeople
American male writers
Communications consultants
Year of birth missing (living people)